Bouko (also spelled Bouka) is a town in north-eastern Ivory Coast. It is a sub-prefecture of Bouna Department in Bounkani Region, Zanzan District.

Bouko was a commune until March 2012, when it became one of 1126 communes nationwide that were abolished.
In 2014, the population of the sub-prefecture of Bouko was 15,319.

Villages
The eighty five villages of the sub-prefecture of Bouko and their population in 2014 are:

Notes

Sub-prefectures of Bounkani
Former communes of Ivory Coast